Stanley Harold "Betz" Klopp (December 22, 1910 – March 11, 1980) is a former Major League Baseball pitcher. He played one season with the Boston Braves in 1944.

His lone victory came on July 30 over the Pittsburgh Pirates. Entering the game to replace an injured pitcher, Klopp successfully retired the next 2 batters before being replaced when the Braves next batted. The Braves regained the lead in that inning, with Klepp recording the victory.

References

External links

Photo

Major League Baseball pitchers
Boston Braves players
Providence Grays (minor league) players
Oakland Oaks (baseball) players
Milwaukee Brewers (minor league) players
Rochester Red Wings players
Clinton Owls players
Pine Bluff Judges players
Indianapolis Indians players
Baseball players from Providence, Rhode Island
1910 births
1959 deaths
People from Berks County, Pennsylvania
Nashville Vols players